Colin Murray (born 26 December 1955) is a Trinidadian cricketer. He played in two first-class matches for Trinidad and Tobago in 1973/74 and 1980/81. He subsequently had a career as a cricket commentator and board member of the Queen's Park Cricket Club.

See also
 List of Trinidadian representative cricketers

References

External links
 

1955 births
Living people
Trinidad and Tobago cricketers